"Forever" is a song by Kenny Loggins from his 1985 album, Vox Humana. It was released as the second single from the album, after "Vox Humana", and became another top 40 hit for Loggins. The song was originally written for a short film called Access All Areas produced by Jenny Sullivan (ex-wife of Jim Messina, Loggins' former bandmate). Some of its success on the charts can be attributed to its use in the soap opera, The Young and the Restless.  Loggins has often used the song to close out his live performances.

Charts

Credits and personnel
Kenny Loggins - vocals
Tris Imboden – drums
Buzzy Feiten – electric guitar
Steve Lukather – guitar solo
Nathan East – bass
David Foster & Steve Wood – keyboards

Credits adapted from the album's liner notes.

References

1985 songs
1985 singles
Kenny Loggins songs
Song recordings produced by David Foster
Songs written by David Foster
Songs written by Kenny Loggins
Columbia Records singles
Rock ballads